American College of the Building Arts (ACBA) is a private four-year liberal arts and sciences college located in Charleston, South Carolina. It is licensed by the South Carolina Commission on Higher Education to grant a Bachelor of Applied Science and an Associate of Applied Science in six craft specializations in the building arts.

The college's model is unique in the United States, with its focus on total integration of a liberal arts and science education and the traditional building arts skills. Students choose from among six craft specializations: timber framing, architectural carpentry, plaster, classical architecture, blacksmithing and stone carving.

ACBA's stated mission is to educate and train artisans in the traditional building arts in order to foster exceptional craftsmanship and encourage the preservation, enrichment and understanding of the world's architectural heritage through a liberal arts and science education.

Current students come from more than 30 states. One quarter of the student body is female and one fifth are veterans. The majority of students have secured employment in their respective trades prior to graduation, aided by expertise gained from their education and externship experiences, critical analysis and deep knowledge base in preservation, restoration and appropriate materials needed in each of their chosen fields. The interdisciplinary approach allows graduates to be as educated as the architects with whom they work.

History 
American College of the Building Arts was founded in the aftermath of Hurricane Hugo, which struck the Southeastern coast of the United States in 1989. The devastating category four hurricane damaged or destroyed many historical coastal-Carolina buildings and left much of Charleston's iron, plaster and fine wood work in disrepair. It took ten years to rebuild and restore the city's damaged homes and historical buildings, in part, because of a shortage of skilled artisans. In 1999, in response to this gap in the building arts, a group of local movers and shakers planted the seeds that led to the founding of ACBA.

Initially, classes and workshops that focused on the building arts were offered at a number of different Charleston area locations. However, the original educational model proved difficult to execute, and the college founders regrouped to establish a degree-granting college, integrating the American liberal arts degree model with the artisan teaching styles of Europe. In 2004, ACBA was licensed by the South Carolina Commission on Higher Education to recruit students for a Bachelor of Applied Science and an Associate of Applied Science in the building arts. In 2009 the college awarded its first degrees to seven students. During these same years, ACBA reconfigured its administration, hiring current president, Lt.(ret.) General Colby M. Broadwater III and other administrative team members with strong business experience.

Academics 
American College of the Building Arts combines a traditional liberal arts education with programs in trade education that are based on European and other models. The framing and plaster programs are based on the French “les Compagnons du Devoir,” a trade guild offering high-skill vocational and educational training rich in culture and humanity. The stone program is based on programs at Lincoln Cathedral and Wells Cathedral in the United Kingdom. The iron program has a long association with Colonial Williamsburg and also with the work of Philip Simmons, famed Charleston ironwork artisan and one of the founders of ACBA. Pieces designed and made by Simmons are displayed at the Smithsonian Institution, South Carolina State Museum and outside the United States in France and China. In addition to trade-specific classes, students pursue a course of general studies that includes not only typical college courses, such as English and mathematics, but also specialized courses in drawing, design, materials science and construction management. ACBA maintains a low student-to-faculty ratio to ensure the highest standards of quality in its programs.

The Byrne-Diderot Library is a major research resource for students and faculty. The library houses a specialized collection of books, periodicals, newspapers and audiovisual materials in the building, visual, decorative and liberal arts. The library's main collection contains over 6.500 items. The D.A.R. Special Collections room contains another 500 rare books, catalogs and periodicals, as well as examples of historical tools and 19th century Charleston iron work.

Media 
ACBA has been featured on This Old House, Forbes, Garden & Gun, Voice of America, Worth, Wolverine Boots, White House Chronicle., and PBS NewsHour

Campus history 
American College of the Building Arts first classes were offered at several different locations in and around the city of Charleston, including the Old Charleston District Jail, which became the college's primary location for 17 years. Carpentry and forged architectural iron programs were housed at a separate site. The Jail was originally constructed in 1802 and expanded in 1855 to include living quarters for the warden and jailers on the street side and an octagonal rear wing. Many infamous inmates were housed in the prison, including high seas pirates, the female mass murderer Lavinia Fischer and Denmark Vesey, a free African American who plotted a slave rebellion that was discovered before it could be executed. During the Civil War both Confederate and Union prisoners were incarcerated within its walls. Although it had no electricity or running water, the jail housed prisoners until it was decommissioned in 1939.

During the years spent occupying and renovating the jail, the college viewed itself as caretaker of the building and its rich history. As part of ACBA's living learning laboratory, faculty members led students in assessing needs and proper methods of restoration, preservation and reconstruction.

Having outgrown its existing facilities, ACBA launched a major fundraising effort in 2014 to establish a single, expanded campus that could consolidate the teaching of all trades under one roof. With a major donation from Parallel Capital and from Russell and Betty Joan Hitt, founders of Virginia-based HITT Contracting, early supporters of ACBA, the college raised funds to purchase and renovate the abandoned Charleston Trolley Barn on Upper Meeting Street. On May 7, 2015, 150 people attended the ground breaking ceremony.

It took just over one year and approximately $6 million to build the new state-of-the-art ACBA campus that was formally opened in October 2016. The newly repurposed building maintains the historical ethos of the original structure while providing the students with modern academic and workshop space. Approximately 39,000 square feet were carved out of the barn's original 24,000 square foot footprint. The front third of the three-story building houses an exhibition lobby, administrative offices, classrooms, labs and a community room available to local civic groups. Workshops and trade classrooms are located in the back two-thirds of the building. A student lounge, faculty offices and conference spaces occupy the second floor. The third floor rafters house the architecture studio and ACBA's unique library and its special collections.  The building has been listed on the National Register of Historic Places.

In September 2018, the college received national accreditation from the Accrediting Commission of Career Schools and Colleges.

Additional programs
A diverse lineup of evening courses was introduced to the public beginning in the fall of 2017, including AutoCAD, interior design and history of Charleston architecture. In January 2018, ACBA initiated intensive one-week courses in areas such as sculptural blacksmithing, decorative woodcarving, furniture restoration, furniture design and stained glass. In the Fall of 2018, the school added an undergraduate major in classical architecture and design.

References

External links 
 Welcome - American College of the Building Arts in Charleston, SC
American College of the Building Arts page at Craft in America
 

2004 establishments in South Carolina
Education in Charleston, South Carolina
Educational institutions established in 2004
Liberal arts colleges in South Carolina
National Register of Historic Places in Charleston, South Carolina
Private universities and colleges in South Carolina